Jimmy Donny Cosgrove (born James Cosgrove, 13 April 1985) is a writer, actor and comedian from Andover, Hampshire. He is known for co-writing the BBC 1 sitcom Warren starring Martin Clunes.

Early life and education
Cosgrove was born in Winchester to Liz and Dave Cosgrove. He has two sisters and attended Harrow Way Community and Kimpton Primary School as a child. He studied comedy writing and performance at Southampton Solent University, despite only obtaining 1 GCSE pass. Cosgrove told a podcast in 2019, "I just kind of blagged my way in. I got the number and email address of the course tutor and bombarded him every day for 6 weeks. In the end, he rang me and asked me to stop emailing him but he did invite me for an audition. I started uni 2 weeks later".

Career
Cosgrove hosts a weekly podcast with writing partner Paul Mckenna and writer of the Sky sitcom 'Hitmen' Joe Parham called 'The Paul Mckenna & Jimmy Donny Cosgrove (with Joe Parham) Podcast'.

References

External links

1985 births
English male writers
English male comedians
21st-century English male actors
Actors from Winchester
Living people
Male actors from Hampshire
English male television actors
Writers from Winchester